Tenu (also known as Tenughat) is a census town in the Petarwar CD block in the Bermo subdivision of the Bokaro district in the Indian state of Jharkhand. It is located at the foot of Tenughat Dam, 42 km from Bokaro Steel City, the district headquarters,

Geography

Location

Area overview
Bokaro district consists of undulating uplands on the Chota Nagpur Plateau with the Damodar River cutting a valley right across. The East Bokaro Coalfield located in the Bermo-Phusro area and small intrusions of Jharia Coalfield make Bokaro a coal rich district. In 1965, one of the largest steel manufacturing units in the country, Bokaro Steel Plant, operated by Steel Authority of India Limited, was set-up at Bokaro Steel City. The Damodar Valley Corporation established its first thermal power station at Bokaro (Thermal). The soil is generally infertile and agriculture is mostly rain-fed.

Note: The map alongside presents some of the notable locations in the district. All places marked in the map are linked in the larger full screen map.

Demographics
According to the 2011 Census of India, Tenu had a total population of 4,533, of which 2,523 (56%) were males and 2,010 (44%) were females. Population in the age range 0–6 years was 448. The total number of literate persons in Tenu was 3,619 (88.59% of the population over 6 years).

Infrastructure
According to the District Census Handbook 2011, Bokaro, Tenu  covered an area of 5.46 km2. Among the civic amenities, it had 2 km roads with open drains, the protected water supply involved tapwater from treated sources, handpump, overhead tank. It had 765 domestic electric connections, 62 road lighting points. Among the medical facilities, it had 3 hospitals, 3 dispensaries, 3 health centres, 15 family welfare centres, 3 maternity and child welfare centres, 3 maternity homes, 11 nursing homes, no medicine shop. Among the educational facilities it had 1 primary school, 3 middle schools, 4 secondary schools,  4 senior secondary schools, the nearest   general degree college at Tenudam-cum-Kathara 6 km away. It had the branch office of 1 nationalised bank.

Economy

Tenughat Dam
Tenughat Dam was constructed across the Damodar River in 1978 by the Government of Bihar, outside the control of the Damodar Valley Corporation.

References

Cities and towns in Bokaro district